The 2020 Mercer Tennis Classic was a professional tennis tournament played on outdoor hard courts. It was the eighth edition of the tournament which was part of the 2020 ITF Women's World Tennis Tour. It took place in Macon, Georgia, United States between 19 and 25 October 2020.

Singles main-draw entrants

Seeds

 1 Rankings are as of 12 October 2020.

Other entrants
The following players received wildcards into the singles main draw:
  Catherine Bellis
  Emma Navarro
  Katerina Stewart
  Lulu Sun

The following player received entry as a junior exempt:
  Diane Parry

The following players received entry from the qualifying draw:
  Tessah Andrianjafitrimo
  Verónica Cepede Royg
  Magdalena Fręch
  Varvara Lepchenko
  María Camila Osorio Serrano
  Gabriela Talabă
  Katie Volynets
  Renata Zarazúa

The following player received entry as a lucky loser:
  Marie Benoît

Champions

Singles

 Catherine Bellis def.  Marta Kostyuk, 6–4, 6–7(4–7), 0–0, ret.

Doubles

 Magdalena Fręch /  Katarzyna Kawa def.  Francesca Di Lorenzo /  Jamie Loeb, 7–5, 6–1

References

External links
 2020 Mercer Tennis Classic at ITFtennis.com
 Official website

2020 ITF Women's World Tennis Tour
2020 in American tennis
October 2020 sports events in the United States